Lee Middleton may refer to:
 Lee Everett Alkin (born 1937) British singer and psychic, called "Lady Lee" Middleton in the 1960s
 Lee Middleton (footballer) (born 1970), played twice for Coventry City in the 1989–90 English First Division
 Lee Middleton (Coronation Street), character played by Nicholas Bailey in 1996–97